Seasoning is the process of supplementing food via herbs, spices, salts, and/or sugar, intended to enhance a particular flavour.

General meaning
Seasonings include herbs and spices, which are themselves frequently referred to as "seasonings". However, Larousse Gastronomique states that "to season and to flavor are not the same thing", insisting that seasoning includes a large or small amount of salt being added to a preparation. Salt may be used to draw out water, or to magnify a natural flavor of a food making it richer or more delicate, depending on the dish. This type of procedure is akin to curing. For instance, sea salt (a coarser-grained salt) is rubbed into chicken, lamb, and beef to tenderize the meat and improve flavour. Other seasonings like black pepper and basil transfer some of their flavors to the food. A well-designed dish may combine seasonings that complement each other.

In addition to the choice of herbs and seasoning, the timing of when flavors are added will affect the food that is being cooked or otherwise prepared.

In some cultures, meat may be seasoned by pouring seasoning sauce over the dish at the table. A variety of seasoning techniques exist in various cultures. Seasoning means bringing out or intensifying the natural flavor of the food without changing it. Seasonings are usually added near the end of the cooking period. The most common seasonings are salt, pepper, and acids (such as lemon juice). When seasonings are used properly, they cannot be tasted; their job is to heighten the flavors of the original ingredients.

Researchers have found traces of garlic mustard seeds in prehistoric pots that also contained traces of other animals, making this the earliest recording of seasoning food.

Oil infusion
Infused oils are also used for seasoning. There are two methods for doing an infusion—hot and cold. Olive oil makes a good infusion base for some herbs, but tends to go rancid more quickly than other oils. Infused oils should be kept refrigerated. It is important to note that butter is not considered a seasoning.

Escoffier
In Le Guide culinaire, Auguste Escoffier divides seasoning and condiments into the following groups:

Seasonings

 Saline seasonings – salt, spiced salt, saltpeter.
 Acid seasonings – plain vinegar (sodium acetate), or same aromatized with tarragon; verjuice, lemon and orange juices.
 Hot seasonings – peppercorns, ground or coarsely chopped pepper, or mignonette pepper; paprika, curry, cayenne, and mixed pepper spices.
 Spice seasonings – made by using essential oils like paprika, clove oil, etc.

Condiments

 The pungents – onions, shallots, garlic, chives, and horseradish.
 Hot condiments – mustard, gherkins, capers, English sauces, such as Worcestershire sauce, ketchup, etc. and American sauces such as chili sauce, Tabasco, A1 Steak Sauce, etc.; the wines used in reductions and braisings; the finishing elements of sauces and soups.
 Fatty substances – most animal fats, butter, vegetable greases (edible oils and margarine).

See also
 Condiment
 Flavoring
 List of culinary herbs and spices
 List of spice mixes
 Popcorn seasoning

References

Cooking techniques
Culinary terminology
Spices